Brian Frank Dutton,  (15 November 1931 – 23 April 2018) was a Royal Navy bomb-disposal officer who served in the Falklands War. He was awarded the Distinguished Service Order in 1982 for disposing of an unexploded Argentine bomb on HMS Argonaut, and the Queen's Gallantry Medal for dealing with an unexploded German mine in 1974. On retirement he was beadle of the Worshipful Company of Carpenters, later a liveryman of that company, mayor of Petersfield and chairman of East Hampshire council.

References

1931 births
2018 deaths
Bomb disposal personnel
Companions of the Distinguished Service Order
People from Southend-on-Sea
Recipients of the Queen's Gallantry Medal
Royal Navy officers
Royal Navy personnel of the Falklands War
Royal Navy personnel of the Korean War
Military personnel from Southend-on-Sea